Philippe Régnier is Professor at the School of International Development and Global Studies at the University of Ottawa. He was formerly Professor at the Graduate Institute of International and Development Studies in Geneva and Director of its Centre for Contemporary Asian Studies for 12 years. His publications focus on the socio-economic development of emerging economies.

He received a diploma in International Relations from the University of Strasbourg in 1980. He attended the College of Europe in Bruges with a scholarship from the French Foreign Office, where he graduated first of his class, the Jean Monnet Promotion (1980-1981). He received a doctorate from the Graduate Institute of International Studies in Geneva in 1986. In November 2016,

References

College of Europe alumni
Academic staff of the University of Ottawa
University of Strasbourg alumni
Graduate Institute of International and Development Studies alumni
Academic staff of the Graduate Institute of International and Development Studies
Living people
Year of birth missing (living people)